Nicholas Chrysostom Matz (April 6, 1850 – August 9, 1917) was a French-born prelate of the Catholic Church. He served as Bishop of Denver from 1889 until his death in 1917.

Biography
Nicholas Matz was born in Munster, Lorraine, to Antoine and Marie-Anne Boul Matz. He began his classical course at the minor seminary of Fénétrange in 1865. In 1868 he and his family came to the United States, where they settled at Cincinnati, Ohio. He then studied for the priesthood at Mount St. Mary's of the West Seminary. He accepted an invitation from Bishop Joseph Projectus Machebeuf in 1869 to join the newly erected Apostolic Vicariate of Colorado. After his arrival in Colorado, Matz was ordained a priest by Bishop Machebeuf on May 31, 1874. He then served as a curate at the cathedral of Denver until 1877, when he became pastor of Our Lady of Lourdes Church in Georgetown. He there erected a church, parochial school, and a hospital, which he placed under the care of the Sisters of St. Joseph. He was transferred to St. Anne's Church at Denver in 1885.

On August 16, 1887, Matz was appointed Coadjutor Bishop of Denver and Titular Bishop of Telmissus by Pope Leo XIII. He received his episcopal consecration on the following October 28 from Archbishop Jean-Baptiste Salpointe. Upon the death of Bishop Machebeuf, Matz succeeded him as the second Bishop of Denver on July 10, 1889. During his 28-year-long tenure, he made Catholic education his top priority, establishing dozens of parochial schools and demanding that Catholic parents send their children to Catholic schools under pain of mortal sin. In 1905 he founded St. Thomas Seminary, which was staffed by the Vincentians. He broke ground for the new Cathedral of the Immaculate Conception in 1902, later dedicating it in 1912. He also established thirty-four new parishes, a cemetery, and a diocesan newspaper. However, he met opposition from many priests and his ambitious building projects drove the diocese into a large amount of debt. He was a strong opponent of labor unions, especially the Western Federation of Miners.

Following a nervous breakdown and a series of strokes, Matz delegated the administration of the diocese to his vicar general and requested his own coadjutor bishop. He later died at St. Anthony's Hospital, aged 67.

References

External links
 

1850 births
1917 deaths
People from Moselle (department)
French emigrants to the United States
The Athenaeum of Ohio alumni
French Roman Catholic bishops in North America
Roman Catholic bishops of Denver
19th-century Roman Catholic bishops in the United States
20th-century Roman Catholic bishops in the United States
People from Georgetown, Colorado